Wenze may refer to:

 Wenze, Klötze, a village in Saxony-Anhalt, Germany
 Wenze Road Station, Hangzhou Metro, China